I Used to Be a Sparrow is an alternative rock band based in Västerås, Sweden.  The act mainly consists of Andrea Caccese and Dick Pettersson, and has so far released two studio albums, the second of which is entitled "You Are An Empty Artist.

Album history 
Pettersson, who had worked in the band "In These Woods", and Caccese, who was performing under the name "Songs for the Sleepwalkers", met at a local concert venue in late 2011. The pair began working together,  producing and distributing their debut album Luke under Caccese's imprint, Paper Wings Music.

Luke was released in March 2012. The album contains eleven songs and it includes influences from several genres of music.  The release of the single "Life is Good" led to the album being reviewed by a number of independent music blogs and online publications, as well as featured on  Sveriges Radio and MTV Italy.  Mainly positive reception led to re-issues over the spring 2012, including a British edition under Special Blend Records, a version for the Japanese market under Thistime Records, and a feature on Sound Supp.ly's drop 4.

I Used To Be A Sparrow went on a summer European tour in support of the album, performing in Germany, Italy, Sweden, Slovakia, Czech Republic and Belgium. The band performed at the 2012 Neapolis Festival in Italy. and was one of several emerging bands providing music at the Giffon Film Festival.

Later that year the group released a single entitled "Warpaint On Invisible Children" on UK magazine Clash Music.  A full album streaming of their second album, You are an Empty Artist, was then released on Italian independent music magazine Freak Out. A cassette version of the album was also released by Jeremy Records.

In 2013, the band collaborated with the Italian band Fabryka to record the album "Echo".

Band members 
 Dick Pettersson – vocals, guitar & keys
 Andrea Caccese – vocals, guitar & keys

Other musicians and usual collaborators
 Nicklas Sandström – guitar, drums & multi-instrumentalist
 Erik Moberg – bass, drums & multi-instrumentalist
 Adam Mellesmo – drums
 Maria Schweitz – vocals

Discography 
Studio albums 
 Luke (2012)
 You are an Empty Artist (2013)

References

External links

Swedish indie rock groups